Super Turrican is a video game in the Turrican series for the NES released in 1992.

Gameplay 

Several changes have been made in comparison to the original games, e.g. four difficulty levels, the possibility to run faster by holding the fire button, no time limit and no checkpoint so the player has to start the level at the beginning after dying.

Synopsis 
Super Turrican for Nintendo Entertainment System uses the same basic story premise previously seen in the instruction manual of Turrican II: The Final Fight, which differs from its actual story as seen in the introductory sequence and takes place in the setting of fictional planet Landorin. A long time ago, in a galaxy far, far away, brave rebellious fighters destroyed the menacing hordes of The Machine and its tyranny-spreading satellite, which circled the planet of the brave, the planet called Landorin. The evil moon was gone, but Landorin was not free. The Machine still ruled the surface of the planet. The Landorins retreated to the inner core of their world to await their inevitable death. The machines and mutants, however, went on to roam through the deserted ruins of a long-lost paradise in search of the entrance to the secret caves. Before the Landorins retreated, they managed to send a desperate cry for help: A last radio signal floats through the endless reaches of the tri-solar system and off to the farthest reaches of the universe. The cry was heard by a man with the courage to face the hordes and free the last survivors of Landorin, a man on his most dangerous adventure ever, Turrican.

Development and release 
Super Turrican for the Nintendo Entertainment System was developed by series creator Manfred Trenz alone and it is based roughly on the first two Turrican games. In a 2006 interview with Retro Gamer, Trenz stated he felt unsatisfied with the final game due to the lack of gameplay elements from earlier entries and same difficulty level as a result from a short development cycle. The NES version of Super Turrican was also the only game in the series scored by Trenz. To compose the soundtrack, he used a sound driver programmed by David Whittaker, which he then edited to use with the game. The final boss originated from Aldynes. Super Turrican for the NES was published only in Europe by Imagineer in 1992 and was never released outside European territories.

Reception 

Super Turrican for the Nintendo Entertainment System was met with mostly positive reception from critics.

References

External links 
 Super Turrican at GameFAQs
 Super Turrican at Giant Bomb
 Super Turrican at MobyGames

1992 video games
Europe-exclusive video games
Nintendo Entertainment System games
Nintendo Entertainment System-only games
Run and gun games
Science fiction video games
Side-scrolling video games
Single-player video games
Turrican
Video games developed in Germany
Films set on fictional planets
Rainbow Arts games